Manhattan Memories, is an album by jazz pianist Al Haig featuring trio and quartet recorded in 1977 and released on the short-lived Sea Breeze label in 1983.

Reception 

The Allmusic review by Scott Yanow states, "Haig's style was largely unchanged from his earlier prime although he had grown as a player".

Track listing 
 "Tea Dreams" (Joe Kennedy) – 6:24
 "Come Sunday" (Duke Ellington) – 7:12
 "I'll Keep Loving" (Bud Powell) – 3:20
 "Manhattan Memories" (Al Haig, Toshiya Taenaka) – 4:20
 "My Little Brown Book" (Billy Strayhorn) – 6:22
 "Voices Within Me" (Cedar Walton) – 5:00
 "Nuages" (Django Reinhardt) – 4:45

Personnel 
Al Haig – piano
Jamil Nasser – bass
Frank Gant (tracks 4-7), Jimmy Wormworth (tracks 1-3) – drums
Eddie Diehl – guitar (tracks 4-7)

References 

Al Haig albums
1983 albums